Cycling at the 2010 Asian Games was held in Guangzhou, China. Road bicycle racing was held at the Triathlon Venue from November 20 to 23, while track cycling was contested at Guangzhou Velodrome from November 13 to 17, and mountain biking was contested at Dafushan Mountain Bike Course on November 18, and BMX racing was contested at Guangzhou Velodrome on November 19.

Schedule

Medalists

BMX

Mountain bike

Road

Track

Medal table

Participating nations
A total of 217 athletes from 27 nations competed in athletics at the 2010 Asian Games:

References

External links
Official website
Complete Results

 
2010
2010 Asian Games events
Asian Games